Martin Grubinger (born 29 May 1983 in Salzburg) is an Austrian drummer and multi-percussionist.

Early life
Grubinger received his first instruction from his father, Martin Grubinger, Senior, a percussionist and percussion instructor at the Mozarteum. At an early age, he competed in the Marimba Competition in Okaya (Japan) and the EBU Competition in Norway, where he was a finalist. He studied at the Bruckner Conservatory in Linz and starting in 2000 at the Mozarteum in Salzburg.

Since academic year 2018/19 Grubinger is a professor of classical percussion at the Mozarteum Salzburg.

Career
Grubinger represented Austria at the Eurovision Young Musicians 2000 in Bergen, Norway.

He was one of the presenters of the Eurovision Young Musicians 2012, held in Vienna. Three years later he performed again in Vienna as an interval act in the Eurovision Song Contest 2015.

References

External links 

 
 
 mica-Interview mit Martin Grubinger, musicaustria.at, 5 October 2010

Austrian drummers
Male drummers
1983 births
Living people
Musicians from Salzburg
Eurovision Young Musicians Finalists
21st-century drummers
21st-century male musicians
Classical percussionists